Footy or footie may refer to:

 Some forms of football: 
 Association football 
 Australian rules football
 Rec footy
 9-a-side footy
 The Footy Show (AFL)
 Rugby league football
 Touch footy
 The Footy Show (rugby league)
 Rugby Union
 Footy (model yacht), one-foot-long sailboat 
 Footy, style of egg cup
 Footy, a.k.a. Blanket sleeper
 a short form of video footage.

See also
 Footsie (disambiguation)